The 4th Iowa Light Artillery Battery was a light artillery battery from Iowa that served in the Union Army between November 23, 1863, and July 14, 1865, during the American Civil War

Service 
The 4th Iowa Light Artillery was mustered into Federal service at Davenport, Iowa for a three-year enlistment on November 23, 1863. The battery was mustered out of Federal service on July 14, 1865.

Total strength and casualties 
A total of 171 men served in the 4th Iowa Battery at one time or another during its existence.
It suffered 5 enlisted men who died of disease, for a total of 5 fatalities.

References

Bibliography 
The Civil War Archive

Units and formations of the Union Army from Iowa
Iowa
1863 establishments in Iowa
Military units and formations established in 1863
Military units and formations disestablished in 1865